York Suburban School District is a midsized, suburban, public school district located in York County, Pennsylvania, (USA). According to 2000 federal census data, it serves a resident population of 21,067 people. In 2010 the US Census Bureau reported a population of 21,684 people. In 2009, the District residents’ per capita income was $27,028, while the median family income was $59,192. In the Commonwealth, the median family income was $49,501  and the United States median family income was $49,445, in 2010.

York Suburban School District operates six schools: Yorkshire Elementary School (Valley View at Yorkshire), Valley View Elementary School, East York Elementary School, Indian Rock Elementary School, York Suburban Middle School, and York Suburban Senior High School. Valley View and Yorkshire consist of grades K-2.  Indian Rock Elementary and East York Elementary both consist of grades 3–5.  York Suburban Middle School consists of grades 6–8.  York Suburban Senior High School consists of grades 9-12. The district's colors are orange and black with the Trojan as the mascot.

Extracurriculars
York Suburban School District's students have access to a wide variety of clubs, activities and an extensive sports program.

Sports
The District funds:

Boys
Baseball - AAA
Basketball- AAA
Cross Country - AA
Football - AAA
Golf - AAA
Lacrosse - AAAA
Soccer - AA
Swimming and Diving - AA
Tennis - AA
Track and Field - AAA
Volleyball - AA
Wrestling	- AAA

Girls
Basketball - AAA
Cross Country - AA
Field Hockey - AA
Golf - AAA
Lacrosse - AAAA
Soccer (Fall) - AA
Softball - AAA
Swimming and Diving - AA
Girls' Tennis - AAA
Track and Field - AAA
Volleyball - AA

Middle School Sports

Boys
Basketball
Cross Country
Football
Track and Field
Wrestling	

Girls
Basketball
Cross Country
Field Hockey
Track and Field

According to PIAA directory July 2012

References 

School districts in York County, Pennsylvania
Springettsbury Township, York County, Pennsylvania